Nikodem Milewski is a multi-award winning Mix engineer, Mastering engineer and music producer based in Vienna, Austria. In 2015 he has won the "Amadeus Austrian Music Award" for Best Engineered Album 2015  (Klangkarussell - Netzwerk (Falls Like Rain)).

Discography

References 

Year of birth missing (living people)
Living people
Austrian record producers
Musicians from Vienna